The Northern New South Wales Zone Football League Two or Zone League Two is an Australian soccer league in Northern New South Wales. It is the fifth tier of soccer in the Northern New South Wales Football 6-tier system behind the NPL Northern NSW, Northern NSW State League Division 1, Zone Premier League and Zone League One.

Teams are currently not promoted or relegated between Northern NSW State League Division 1 and Zone Premier League.

The players in the league are amateur.

2023 Season Teams
The competition is made up of 10 teams, playing each other three times.
Barnsley UFC 
Bellbird Bombers JFC P
Cardiff City FC P
Cooks Hill United FC R
Greta Branxton FC
Kurri Kurri FC P
Lambton Jaffas JFC 1
Medowie FC P
Nelson Bay FC R
Southern United FC M (moved from Coastal Premier League)
P Promoted from Zone League Three  |  1 Promoted from All Age  |   R Relegated  |  M Moved Competition 

All teams are required to present in 2 grades, firsts and reserves. Promotion is decided by the success of the first grade side.

References

 Zone League Competitions
 Northern NSW Football Federation
 Newcastle Football
 Macquarie Football
 Hunter Valley Football

Soccer leagues in New South Wales